My Best Gal is a 1944 American comedy film directed by Anthony Mann and written by Olive Cooper and Earl Felton. The film stars Jane Withers, Jimmy Lydon, Frank Craven, Fortunio Bonanova, George Cleveland and Franklin Pangborn. The film was released on March 28, 1944, by Republic Pictures.

Plot
Kitty O'Hara (Jane Withers) has a good singing voice but will have nothing to do with trying to use it in the theatre or on the radio. She and her grandfather, Danny O'Hara (Frank Craven), and ex-vaudeville hoofer, work in a Broadway drug store, rendezvous of young aspiring actors and performers, Danny and his friend Johnny McCloud (Jimmy Lydon), embryo writer of musicals, conspire to have Kitty's voice auditioned by a radio man. Her anger at discovering she's been tricked subsides when Johnny's induction notice into the U.S. Army arrives, and she tries to interest Broadway producer Ralph Hodges (George Cleveland) in Johnny's musical show. It is auditioned, using the talents of all young unknown performers, and Hodges wants to buy it, but without the youthful talent. Johnny rejects the offer until Danny becomes ill and needs an expensive operation, which Johnny secretly uses the money from selling his show to Hodgs. Kitty and his friends think Johnny has betrayed them.

Cast  
Jane Withers as Kitty O'Hara
Jimmy Lydon as Johnny McCloud
Frank Craven as Danny O'Hara
Fortunio Bonanova as Charlie
George Cleveland as Ralph Hodges
Franklin Pangborn as Mr. Porter
Mary Newton as Miss Simpson
Jack Boyle as Freddy

References

External links 
 

1944 films
1940s English-language films
American comedy films
1944 comedy films
Republic Pictures films
Films directed by Anthony Mann
American black-and-white films
1940s American films